Bromelia antiacantha is a plant species in the genus Bromelia. This species is native to Brazil and Uruguay.

References

antiacantha
Flora of Uruguay
Flora of Brazil
Plants described in 1824